Bruce Graham (born December 2, 1985) is a Canadian former professional ice hockey forward who last played for the Nottingham Panthers in the Elite Ice Hockey League (EIHL).

Playing career
Graham was drafted from the Moncton Wildcats of the Quebec Major Junior Hockey League to the New York Rangers, 51st overall in the 2004 NHL Entry Draft. With his large frame and at the conclusion of his major junior career he was signed to a three-year entry level contract with the Rangers in time for the 2005-06 season with affiliate, the Hartford Wolf Pack of the American Hockey League. In his tenure within the Rangers organization, Graham was unable to establish himself and was released as a free agent at the conclusion of his contract.

Graham established himself within the Allen Americans in the 2009-10 season. He scored 79 points in 64 games and a leading 22 points in 20 post-season games. In his second season with the Americans he was loaned to the Lake Erie Monsters of the AHL for two games.

On June 27, 2012, Graham left the Americans to sign abroad with British club, the Nottingham Panthers of the EIHL. In his debut season with the Panthers, Graham established himself as the top-line center with the Panthers and the league to contribute with 68 points in 56 games in winning the EIHL Championship. Graham then returned to Allen, Texas for a fourth season and helped defending championships, the Americans defend and claim their second Ray Miron Cup.

Graham decided as a free agent to re-join the Panthers in England, signing a one-year contract on May 30, 2014.

Career statistics

Awards and honours

References

External links

1985 births
Allen Americans players
Bakersfield Condors (1998–2015) players
Canadian ice hockey forwards
Charlotte Checkers (1993–2010) players
Gwinnett Gladiators players
Hartford Wolf Pack players
Ice hockey people from New Brunswick
Lake Erie Monsters players
Living people
Moncton Wildcats players
New York Rangers draft picks
Nottingham Panthers players
Sportspeople from Moncton
Canadian expatriate ice hockey players in England